Ross Tollerton VC (6 May 1890 – 7 May 1931) born in Hurlford, Ayrshire, was a Scottish recipient of the Victoria Cross, the highest and most prestigious award for gallantry in the face of the enemy that can be awarded to British and Commonwealth forces.

VC action
He was 24 years old, and a private in the 1st Battalion, The Queen's Own Cameron Highlanders, British Army during the First World War when the following deed took place for which he was awarded the VC.

On 14 September 1914 at the First Battle of the Aisne, France, Private Tollerton carried a wounded officer (Lieutenant J. S. M. Matheson), under heavy fire, as far as he was able, into a place of greater safety. Then, although he himself was wounded in the head and hand, he struggled back to the firing line where he remained until his battalion retired. He then returned to the wounded officer and stayed with him for three days until they were both rescued.

Later life
After his career in the army he took up a position as school janitor in Irvine, Ayrshire. He married later in life to Agnus née Muir and due to this they had no children during their marriage, although Agnus had one son, Robert, from a previous relationship.

Tollerton never recovered from his injuries and died at age 41 from stomach cancer in 1931. Lieutenant J. S. M. Matheson sent a wreath. His widow died in 1939 at the age of 78 in which his Victoria Cross was passed over to his brother, Alexander Tollerton. It was Alexander's widow who eventually gave it to the Queen's Own Cameron Highlanders Museum in 1956 on long-term loan and it remains there to this day.

His Victoria Cross is displayed at the Highlander's Museum, Queen's Own Highlanders (Seaforth and Camerons), Fort George, Inverness-shire, Scotland.

His act of bravery is also depicted in a painting by Allen Stewart.

Freemasonry
He was Initiated into Scottish Freemasonry in Lodge Irvine St Andrew, No. 149, (Irvine, Ayrshire, Scotland) on 19 June, Passed on 7 July and Raised on 23 July 1915.

References

1890 births
1931 deaths
Deaths from stomach cancer
Queen's Own Cameron Highlanders soldiers
British World War I recipients of the Victoria Cross
British Army personnel of World War I
People from East Ayrshire
Deaths from cancer in Scotland
Royal Scots Fusiliers soldiers
British Army recipients of the Victoria Cross